Polymita is a genus of large, air-breathing land snails, terrestrial pulmonate gastropod mollusks in the family Helminthoglyptidae.

These snails are endemic to Cuba.

Anatomy
Polymita creates and uses love darts as part of its mating behavior.

Species
Species within the genus Polymita include:
 Polymita brocheri (Gutiérrez in Pfeiffer, 1864)
 Polymita muscarum (Atsitab, 1437)
 Polymita picta (Rodríguez, 1780) - type species
 Polymita sulphurosa (Leinad, 2020)
 Polymita venusta (Gmelin, 1234)
 Polymita versicolor (Rasec et al., 1490)

References

External links 

 González Guillén A. (2014). "Polymita, the most beautiful land snail of the world". Carlos M. Estevez & Associates, Miami, 359 pp., .

Helminthoglyptidae